Davida may refer to:

Given name
 Davida Afzelius-Bohlin (1866–1955), Swedish mezzo-soprano 
 Davida Allen (born 1951), Australian painter, filmmaker and writer
 Ottilie Davida Assing (1819–1884), German-American feminist, freethinker, and abolitionist
 Davida Coady (1938-2018), American pediatrician and international health activist
 Davida H. Comba (born 1928), wife of American astronomer Paul G. Comba, Davidacomba minor planet named after
 Davida DaVito, Marvel Comics character
 Davida Hawthorn (born 1918), American table tennis player
 Davida Hesse-Lilienberg (1877–1964), Swedish operatic soprano
 C. Davida Ingram, conceptual artist
 Davida Karol (1917–2011), Israeli actress
 Davida Kidd (born 1956), Canadian artist
 Davida McKenzie, New Zealand actress, Thomasin McKenzie sister
 Davida Rochlin (born 1951), American architect
 Davida Teller (1938–2011), American psychology professor
 Davida Williams (born 1986), American actress, singer, dancer, photographer, director, and producer
 Davida Wills Hurwin, American writer
 Davida White (born 1967), New Zealand rugby union player

Surname
 George Davida, American computer scientist and cryptographer
 Michael Dawida (born 1949), Allegheny County Commissioner
 Osher Davida, Israeli footballer

Other
 511 Davida, large C-type asteroid
 Davida (NGO), NGO that supports sex workers in Brazil

See also
 David (name)
 Davina

Feminine given names